Ainize Barea Nuñez (born 25 January 1992), often known as Peke Barea, is a Spanish footballer who plays as a forward for Athletic Club.

Club career
Barea started her career at CD Ugao (based in Ugao-Miraballes in southern Biscay). Due to the fact that there were two other footballers with the forename Ainize at the club, Barea earned the nickname 'Peke', a reference to the fact that she was only 153cm tall. After playing in the regional Basque League with Ugao for eight years, she transferred to Santa Teresa, who were playing in the Primera División, the top tier of Spanish football. Her two seasons at Badajoz-based Santa Teresa were affected negatively by a knee injury and she joined Deportivo La Coruña afterwards, signing a contract with them on 14 June 2017. She would go on to score 84 goals in 106 games for the club. She remained with Deportivo until July 2021, at which point, she transferred to Athletic Club.

International career
Barea earned her first call up for the Spain national team in a UEFA Euro 2022 qualifying match against Moldova in September 2020. She did not play in the match.

Personal life
Until the age of 12, Barea played both football and Basque pelota. Barea remarked that her family were supportive of her career in sports. In 2019, Barea took part in a strike with the aim of improving the salaries paid to women's footballers in Spain. She is a professional footballer as she derives her entire income from the sport.

References

External links
 
 
 
 

1992 births
Living people
Women's association football forwards
Spanish women's footballers
People from Arrigorriaga
Santa Teresa CD players
Deportivo de La Coruña (women) players
Athletic Club Femenino players
Primera División (women) players
Footballers from the Basque Country (autonomous community)
Sportspeople from Biscay